Federal Route 81, or Jalan Behor Lateh, is a federal road in Perlis, Malaysia, that links Route 7 to Kuala Perlis.

Route background
The Kilometre Zero of the Federal Route 81 starts at Kuala Perlis Post Office in Kuala Perlis.

Features
At most sections, the Federal Route 81 was built under the JKR R5 road standard, allowing maximum speed limit of up to 90 km/h.

From Kampung Titi Serong to Jalan Besar junctions, it overlaps with Changlun-Kuala Perlis Highway (Federal Route 194).

List of junctions

References

Highways in Malaysia
081
Roads in Perlis